Persikad Depok, commonly known as Persikad, was an Indonesian football club based in Depok, West Java. They was compete in Liga 3.

Persikad's home ground is Merpati Stadium, which is located in Depok, West Java.

History 
In 2009, Persikad experienced a severe financial crisis that left the management team owing 11 months' wages to the players. A businessman named Edy Djoekardi rescued the team by buying a majority stake in PT. Persikad Depok. Djoekardi planned to invest millions of dollars to build a team capable of performing up to the international scene, and to build infrastructure, such as stadiums. The club finally was sold and move to Bogor and rebranded as Bogor F.C. in 2017 similar story to Milton Keynes Dons F.C., but later the supporters formed a phoenix club called Persikad 1999 in 2018.

Notable former players

This is the list of several domestic and foreign former notable or famous players of Persikad from time to time.

Indonesia
  Dhika Bayangkara
  Adittia Gigis
  Cucu Hidayat
  Sansan Husaeni
  Reksa Maulana
  Ricky Ohorella
  Samsul Pelu
  Muhammad Roby
  Nehemia Solossa

Africa (CAF)
  Jean Paul Boumsong

South America (CONMEBOL)
  Patricio Jiménez
  Eladio Rojas

References

External links
 Persikad Depok at Liga-Indonesia.co.id

 
Defunct football clubs in Indonesia
Football clubs in Indonesia
Football clubs in West Java
Association football clubs established in 1990
Association football clubs disestablished in 2018
1990 establishments in Indonesia